The Nanya Night Market or Banqiao Night Market is a night market in Banqiao District, New Taipei, Taiwan.

Architecture
Located at the intersection of Nanya East Road and Nanya South Road, the night market is the largest in Banqiao. It has a funnel shape with wide entrance and narrow alley towards the center.

Features
The night market has a range of food to sell and choices of cheap goods. It also features many fashion and game arcades.

Transportation
The night market is accessible within walking distance South West from Fuzhong Station of Taipei Metro.

See also
 List of night markets in Taiwan

References

Night markets in New Taipei
Banqiao District